Shivil Sharma Kaushik (born 7 September 1995) is an Indian cricketer who plays for Hubli Tigers in the Karnataka Premier League and had played for Gujarat Lions in the Indian Premier League.

After a successful outing in the KPL, Kaushik was signed by Gujarat Lions in the 2016 Indian Premier League auction. Although he didn't feature in the starting XI immediately, he made his Twenty20 debut against Rising Pune Supergiants at Pune on 29 April 2016. He took his best T20 bowling figures of 3 wickets for 20 runs against Kings XI Punjab. His mother is currently a Hindi teacher at Army Public School, Bangalore

He studied at the St. Joseph's College of Commerce in Bangalore.

References

External links
 

1995 births
Living people
Indian cricketers
Karnataka cricketers
Gujarat Lions cricketers